Qinghaihu is a   replenishment oiler of the People's Liberation Army Navy (PLAN). Ukraine sold the incomplete ship in 1992 to the People's Republic of China, where it was completed and commissioned in 1996.

In Chinese service, the ship was previously known as Nancang (953). The ship's class has the NATO reporting name Fuso.

Design
The superstructure is modified with a deckhouse forward of the bridge and a working area built over the fuel cargo tanks. The stern is sponsoned for the helicopter pad; a small hangar is also installed.

There are four fuel and two solid store transfer stations. Refueling may be conducted from the stern.

History
The ship was laid down in January 1989 by the Soviet Union at the Kherson Shipyard as Vladimir Peregudov. In 1992, China bought the incomplete ship from Ukraine for $10 million. According to Zhang Gang, chief designer of the replenishment oiler , the purchase was made after the Chinese effort to design a new replenishment ship - ultimately the Type 903 replenishment ship - was delayed due to cost; the PLAN requirement was for one large replenishment per fleet, and it only had two Type 905 replenishment oilers.

The ship sailed nearly complete to Dalian, China in 1993, and completed by the Dalian Shipbuilding Industry Company. She was commissioned into the PLAN in 1996 and assigned to the South Sea Fleet.

See also
, a Komandarm Fedko bought by India

References

Sources

Fusu-class replenishment ships
Auxiliary replenishment ship classes